The acts of the 88th Minnesota Legislature includes all acts by the 88th Minnesota Legislature, which lasts from January 8, 2013, to January 5, 2015.

Bills are enacted after being passed by the Legislature and signed by the governor. However, if the governor vetoes a bill or line-item vetoes items that appropriate money in a bill, the bill or items can still be enacted by a two-thirds vote in both houses, unless the Legislature by adjournment prevents the bill's return.

Summary of actions
In this Legislature, all acts have been approved (signed) by Governor Mark Dayton, with the exception of chapters 123, 124, 303, and items in chapters 99, 137, and 293. Chapter 123 became law without the governor's signature. Chapter 124, a proposed amendment to the Minnesota Constitution, did not require his approval. Chapters 99, 137, and 293 were subject to line-item vetoes. In chapter 99, the omnibus higher education act, an appropriation for a grant to Teach For America was line-item vetoed. In chapter 137, the omnibus legacy act, two appropriations were line-item vetoed: one for the Twin Cities metropolitan area regional parks system and one for aquatic invasive species grants to tribal and local governments. In chapter 293, the so-called "Timberjay bill," wording directing the appropriation of funds from a special account for the use by the legislative auditor was line-item vetoed. Chapter 303, a bill that restricted the Minnesota State Lottery from certain activities, was vetoed in its entirety. No bills or items were enacted by the Legislature over the governor's veto.

Laws

2013

Regular Session

1st Special Session

2014

Regular Session

References

External links
 2013 Regular Session Laws at the Office of the Revisor of Statutes
 2014 Regular Session Laws at the Office of the Revisor of Statutes
 List of act summaries prepared by the House Research Department
 2013 New Laws Session Daily news articles on laws enacted in 2013
 2014 New Laws Session Daily news articles on laws enacted in 2014
 Legislative Tracker at the Office of Governor Mark Dayton

88th Minnesota Legislature
2010s in Minnesota